Lake Montfort School, Bangalore, is a co-educational higher secondary school founded and managed by the Montfort Brothers of St. Gabriel in the city of Bengaluru, in Karnataka, India. The motto of the school is "Rise And Shine".

About Lake Montfort School 
Lake Montfort School, Bangalore, founded in 1998, is managed by the Montfort Brothers of St. Gabriel, a religious Society of the Catholic Church, founded by St. Louis Grignion de Montfort in the 18th century in France. The Montfort Brothers of St. Gabriel  contribute to the field of education throughout the world. In India, they run many schools, colleges and technical institutions, besides engaging in Social Action Movements and other humanitarian services.

Sections 
 Lake Montfort Preparatory School
 Lake Montfort Primary School
 Lake Montfort Secondary School
 Lake Montfort High School

History 
St. Louis Grignion de Montfort, the patron saint of the institution, was born on 31 January 1673 in the small town of Montfort in France.

Houses 
The students and staff members are grouped into four houses.
 Joseph - red		
 Gabriel - blue  	
 Montfort - yellow
 Fatima - green 	
Inter-house and intra-house competitions are held and a shield for the best house of the year is awarded.

Management

The Managing committee 
All the institutions under the Lake Montfort banner  belong  to the  Educational and Charitable society  of  Brothers of  St. Gabriel under the Province of Yercaud. The Provincial Administration consists of six members of which the Provincial Superior is the Chairman.

The Executive committee 
The Executive committee consists of the community of Brothers of the particular institution appointed by the managing committee. The Director/Local Superior of the community of the Brothers is the Chairman of the Executive committee. It is responsible for the drawing up of the policies and programmes for that institution. It is their responsibility to carry out the policies and directives of the Managing committee. It is responsible for the formation of committees for the selection of staff, admissions into schools and hostels.

== References ==

Brothers of Christian Instruction of St Gabriel schools
Catholic secondary schools in India
Christian schools in Karnataka
Primary schools in Karnataka
High schools and secondary schools in Bangalore
Educational institutions established in 1998
1998 establishments in Karnataka